Barm-e Sabz (also known as Barmeh Sabz) is a village in Tayebi-ye Garmsiri-ye Jonubi Rural District, in the Central District of Kohgiluyeh County, Kohgiluyeh and Boyer-Ahmad Province, Iran. At the 2006 census, its population was 138, in 35 families.

References 

Populated places in Kohgiluyeh County